Bill Marr may refer to:

Bill Maher (born 1956), American comedian and political commentator
William Marr (born 1936), engineering researcher and poet